David Hawthorne (born May 14, 1985) is a former American football linebacker. He was signed by the Seattle Seahawks as an undrafted free agent in 2008. He played college football at TCU.

Professional career

Seattle Seahawks
Hawthorne received his first start ever in Week 3 of the 2009 season in place of the injured Lofa Tatupu.  Hawthorne recorded a combined 16 tackles and 1 interception. Tatupu then returned from injury but was shortly fallen again, this time being sidelined for the season. Hawthorne started from Week 8 for the rest of the 2009 season and recorded 117 tackles, 4 sacks, 2 forced fumbles and 3 interceptions.

On December 1, 2011, he returned an interception 77 yards against the Philadelphia Eagles in the 4th quarter.

New Orleans Saints
Hawthorne signed a five-year $19 Million contract with the New Orleans Saints on April 3, 2012. He was released on February 8, 2016.

Buffalo Bills
On August 7, 2016, Hawthorne signed with the Buffalo Bills. On August 30, 2016, he was waived by the Bills.

References

External links

Seattle Seahawks bio

1985 births
Living people
People from Corsicana, Texas
American football linebackers
TCU Horned Frogs football players
Seattle Seahawks players
New Orleans Saints players
Buffalo Bills players